County Road 503 or County Route 503 may refer to:

County Road 503 (Brevard County, Florida)
County Route 503 (New Jersey)